Arhopala aroa is a butterfly in the family Lycaenidae. It was described by William Chapman Hewitson in 1863. It is found in the Indomalayan realm.

Subspecies
A. a. aroa Peninsular Malaya, Borneo, Sumatra, Java, Basilan
A. a. esava Corbet, 1941 Burma, Mergui, Thailand
A. a. pryeri  Butler, 1892 Borneo

References

External links
Arhopala Boisduval, 1832 at Markku Savela's Lepidoptera and Some Other Life Forms. Retrieved June 3, 2017.

Arhopala
Butterflies described in 1863